Prosopocoilus is a genus of beetles of the family Lucanidae.

List of species

 Prosopocoilus antilope (Swederus, 1787)
 Prosopocoilus assimilis (Parry, 1864)
 Prosopocoilus astacoides (Hope, 1840)
 Prosopocoilus aterrimus Nagel, 1938
 Prosopocoilus attenuatus (Parry, 1864)
 Prosopocoilus aulicus Möllenkamp, 1905
 Prosopocoilus bidentatus Bomans, 1978
 Prosopocoilus biplagiatus (Westwood, 1855)
 Prosopocoilus bison (Olivier, 1789)
 Prosopocoilus blanchardi (Parry, 1873)
 Prosopocoilus boreli Boileau, 1904
 Prosopocoilus bruijni Oberthür, 1879
 Prosopocoilus buddha (Hope, 1842)
 Prosopocoilus caprecornus Didier, 1931
 Prosopocoilus cardoni Didier, 1927
 Prosopocoilus chalcoides Lacroix & Ratti, 1983
 Prosopocoilus christophei Bomans, 1978
 Prosopocoilus chujoi DeLisle, 1964
 Prosopocoilus cilipes (Thomson, 1862)
 Prosopocoilus confucius (Hope, 1842)
 Prosopocoilus congoanus Duvivier, 1891
 Prosopocoilus cornuatus Didier, 1927
 Prosopocoilus corporaali Nagel, 1933
 Prosopocoilus crenulidens (Fairmaire, 1895)
 Prosopocoilus curvipes (Hope & Westwood, 1845)
 Prosopocoilus cyclommatoides Lacroix, 1978
 Prosopocoilus debatissei Bomans, 1992
 Prosopocoilus decellei Endrödi, 1968
 Prosopocoilus decipiens (Parry, 1864)
 Prosopocoilus denticulatus Boileau, 1901
 Prosopocoilus dentifer Deyrolle, 1865
 Prosopocoilus dissimilis (Boileau, 1898)
 Prosopocoilus doesburgi Bomans, 1978
 Prosopocoilus doris Kriesche, 1920
 Prosopocoilus dorsalis (Erichson, 1834)
 Prosopocoilus downesi (Hope, 1835)
 Prosopocoilus dubius DeLisle, 1968
 Prosopocoilus duplodentatus Benesh, 1943
 Prosopocoilus erici Bomans, 1992
 Prosopocoilus faber Thomson, 1862
 Prosopocoilus fabricei Lacroix, 1988
 Prosopocoilus feai Boileau, 1902
 Prosopocoilus felschei (Möllenkamp, 1904)
 Prosopocoilus flavidus (Parry, 1862)
 Prosopocoilus flavocinctus Weinreich, 1971
 Prosopocoilus forceps (Vollenhoven, 1861)
 Prosopocoilus forficula (Tomson, 1856)
 Prosopocoilus formosanus (Miwa, 1929)
 Prosopocoilus francisi Arnaud, 1986
 Prosopocoilus fruhstorferi Kolbe, 1897
 Prosopocoilus fuscescens Didier, 1927
 Prosopocoilus fuscocinctus DeLisle, 1973
 Prosopocoilus fuscus Bomans, 1977
 Prosopocoilus gertrudae Arnaud & Lacroix, 1991
 Prosopocoilus giraffa (Olivier, 1842)
 Prosopocoilus gracilis (Saunders, 1854)
 Prosopocoilus granosus Didier, 1929
 Prosopocoilus guerlachi Didier & Séguy, 1952
 Prosopocoilus hachijoensis Nomura, 1960
 Prosopocoilus hasterti Boileau, 1912
 Prosopocoilus henryi (Arrow, 1935)
 Prosopocoilus hiekei (DeLisle, 1970)
 Prosopocoilus histrio (Arrow, 1935)
 Prosopocoilus inclinatus (Motschulsky, 1857)
 Prosopocoilus inermis Séguy, 1955
 Prosopocoilus inouei DeLisle, 1964
 Prosopocoilus ipseni Lacroix, 1987
 Prosopocoilus ismaeli Lacroix, 1984
 Prosopocoilus julietae Nagai & Tsukamoto, 2003
 Prosopocoilus kamanita Kriesche, 1922
 Prosopocoilus kannegieteri (Van de Poll, 1895)
 Prosopocoilus kasaiensis Maes, 1990
 Prosopocoilus katanganus Bomans, 1967
 Prosopocoilus kirchneri Ipsen, 1999
 Prosopocoilus kunikoae Mizunuma, 1994
 Prosopocoilus lacroixi (Bomans, 1970)
 Prosopocoilus lafertei (Reiche, 1852)
 Prosopocoilus laminifer Boileau, 1905
 Prosopocoilus laoticus Kriesche, 1922
 Prosopocoilus lateralis (Hope & Westwood, 1845)
 Prosopocoilus laterinus (Didier, 1928)
 Prosopocoilus laterotarsus Houlbert, 1915
 Prosopocoilus lesnei Didier, 1927
 Prosopocoilus lumawigi DeLisle, 1977
 Prosopocoilus maclellandi (Hope, 1842)
 Prosopocoilus maculatus Bomans, 1967
 Prosopocoilus marginatus Lacroix & Ratti, 1973
 Prosopocoilus micans DeLisle, 1977
 Prosopocoilus mirabilis Boileau, 1904
 Prosopocoilus modestus Parry, 1864
 Prosopocoilus mohnikei Parry, 1873
 Prosopocoilus motschulskii (Waterhouse, 1869)
 Prosopocoilus myrmecoleon (Schaufuss, 1887)
 Prosopocoilus mysticus Parry, 1870
 Prosopocoilus natalensis (Parry, 1864)
 Prosopocoilus neopomeraniensis DeLisle, 1967
 Prosopocoilus nicollei Laxroix, 1978
 Prosopocoilus occipitalis Hope & Westwood, 1845
 Prosopocoilus oweni (Hope & Westwood, 1845)
 Prosopocoilus parryi Boileau, 1913
 Prosopocoilus passaaloides (Hope & Westwood, 1845)
 Prosopocoilus pasteuri Ritsema, 1892
 Prosopocoilus perberi Desfontaine & Moretto, 2003
 Prosopocoilus perplexus (Parry, 1862)
 Prosopocoilus planeti (Boileau, 1897)
 Prosopocoilus politus (Parry, 1862)
 Prosopocoilus porrectus Bomans, 1978
 Prosopocoilus pouillaudei Houbert, 1915
 Prosopocoilus poultoni (Boileau, 1911)
 Prosopocoilus prosopocoeloides Houlbert, 1915
 Prosopocoilus pseudocongoanus Bomans, 1967
 Prosopocoilus pseudodissimilis Y. Kurosawa, 1976
 Prosopocoilus punctatissimus (Fairmaire, 1893)
 Prosopocoilus romeoi Lacroix & Taroni, 1983
 Prosopocoilus rubens Didier, 1927
 Prosopocoilus rubrocastaneus Oberthür & Houlbert, 1914
 Prosopocoilus rusa Kriesche, 1920
 Prosopocoilus savagei (Hope, 1842)
 Prosopocoilus senegalensis (Klug, 1835)
 Prosopocoilus sericeus (Westwood, 1844)
 Prosopocoilus serricornis (Latreille, 1817)
 Prosopocoilus speciosus (Boileau, 1904)
 Prosopocoilus spectabilis (Ritsema, 1913)
 Prosopocoilus specularis Boileau, 1904
 Prosopocoilus spencei (Hope, 1840)
 Prosopocoilus spineus (Didier, 1927)
 Prosopocoilus sprebus (Bomans, 1971)
 Prosopocoilus squamilateris (Parry, 1862)
 Prosopocoilus suturalis (Olivier, 1789)
 Prosopocoilus suevuei Bomans, 1993
 Prosopocoilus suzumurai Nagai, 2000
 Prosopocoilus swanzyanus (Parry, 1870)
 Prosopocoilus sylvicapra Kriesche, 1932
 Prosopocoilus talsalis Ritsema, 1892
 Prosopocoilus tangianus (Didier & Séguy, 1953)
 Prosopocoilus tesserarius (Herbst, 1790)
 Prosopocoilus tigrinus Didier, 1928
 Prosopocoilus torresensis (Deyrolle, 1870)
 Prosopocoilus tragulus (Vollenhoven, 1861)
 Prosopocoilus umhangi (Fairmaire, 1891)
 Prosopocoilus valgipes Kriesche, 1940
 Prosopocoilus variegatus (Boileau, 1904)
 Prosopocoilus viossati Bomans, 1987
 Prosopocoilus wallacei (Parry, 1862)
 Prosopocoilus werneri Bomans, 1999
 Prosopocoilus wimberleyi Parry, 1875
 Prosopocoilus yasusukei H. Ikeda, 1996
 Prosopocoilus zebra (Olivier, 1789)

References

 Biolib

 
Lucanidae genera